Hadi Azizi (born 27 January 1990) is an Iranian footballer who plays as an attacking midfielder. He played in the Iran Pro League for Malavan.

References

External links
 List of players
 persianleague.com 
 

1990 births
Iranian footballers
Living people
Malavan players
Association football midfielders